Blue & Sentimental is an album by American saxophonist Ike Quebec recorded in 1961 and released on the Blue Note label.

The album features a quartet made up of Quebec (occasionally doubling on piano), guitarist Grant Green, and a rhythm section of Paul Chambers on bass and Philly Joe Jones on drums. The album features rare rhythm guitar accompaniment by Green, who was more typically a soloist. The original LP release featured six tracks, and two additional titles ("That Old Black Magic" and "It's All Right With Me") were added to CD reissues starting in 1988. The track "Count Every Star" features a different group of backing musicians.

Reception

The Allmusic review by Steve Huey awarded the album 5 stars and calling it "a superbly sensuous blend of lusty blues swagger and achingly romantic ballads... a quiet, sorely underrated masterpiece".

In 2004, critic Richard Cook wrote that the album "might be Quebec's masterpiece".

1988 CD Track listing
 "Blue and Sentimental" (Count Basie, Mack David, Jerry Livingston) - 7:28
 "Minor Impulse" (Quebec) - 6:34
 "Don't Take Your Love from Me" (Henry Nemo) - 7:04
 "Blues for Charlie" (Green) - 6:48
 "Like" (Quebec) - 5:21
"That Old Black Magic" (Arlen, Mercer) - 4:52 Bonus track on CD reissue
 "It's All Right With Me" (Porter) - 6:05 Bonus track on CD reissue
 "Count Every Star" (Bruno Coquatrix, Sammy Gallop) - 6:16

Recorded on December 16 (tracks 1-7) and December 23 (track 8), 1961.

Personnel
Ike Quebec - tenor saxophone (all tracks), piano (tracks 2, 4, 7)
Grant Green - guitar
Paul Chambers (tracks 1-7), Sam Jones (track 8) - bass
Philly Joe Jones (tracks 1-7), Louis Hayes (track 8) - drums
Sonny Clark - piano (track 8)

References

Blue Note Records albums
Ike Quebec albums
1963 albums
Albums produced by Alfred Lion
Albums recorded at Van Gelder Studio